The New York City Subway's B Division consists of the lines that operate with lettered services (A, B, C, D, E, F, G, J, L, M, N, Q, R, W, and Z),  as well as the Franklin Avenue and Rockaway Park Shuttles. These lines and services were operated by the Brooklyn–Manhattan Transit Corporation (BMT) and city-owned Independent Subway System (IND) before the 1940 city takeover of the BMT.

The B Division is broken down into two subdivisions, B1 (BMT) and B2 (IND), for chaining purposes. The two former systems are still sometimes referred to as the BMT Division and IND Division.

List of lines
The following lines are part of the B Division (services shown in parentheses; lines with colors next to them are trunk lines):

 IND Second Avenue Line
BMT Fourth Avenue Line
 IND Sixth Avenue Line
 IND Eighth Avenue Line
60th Street Tunnel Connection
BMT 63rd Street Line
IND 63rd Street Line
BMT Archer Avenue Line
IND Archer Avenue Line
BMT Astoria Line
BMT Brighton Line
 BMT Broadway Line
 BMT Canarsie Line
Chrystie Street Connection
IND Concourse Line
 IND Crosstown Line
IND Culver Line
 BMT Franklin Avenue Shuttle
IND Fulton Street Line
BMT Jamaica Line
BMT Myrtle Avenue Line
 BMT Nassau Street Line
IND Queens Boulevard Line
IND Rockaway Line
BMT Sea Beach Line
BMT West End Line

History

Early history

The oldest line to become part of the B Division was the BMT Lexington Avenue Line, opened in 1885. A large system of elevated railways in Brooklyn was formed by 1908 by the Brooklyn Rapid Transit Company (BRT), crossing the Brooklyn Bridge and Williamsburg Bridge to Manhattan terminals. With the Dual Contracts, signed in 1913, the BRT acquired extensions outward into Queens, as well as through Lower and Midtown Manhattan. The BRT became the Brooklyn–Manhattan Transit Corporation in 1923 after a bankruptcy.

The Independent Subway System (IND) was created by the city in the 1920s and 1930s as a third system, operated by the city, competing with the BMT and Interborough Rapid Transit Company (IRT). The city took over operations of the BMT and IRT in 1940, consolidating ownership of the three systems into one. Since the original IRT tunnels were smaller, it has remained a separate division to this day.

IND before 1967
IND services were labeled on maps and signs starting with the opening of the first line in 1932. Six letters—A to F—were assigned to the major services, sorted by the north terminal and midtown line, and express services had single letters, while local services had double letters. G and H were assigned to lesser services, which did not enter Manhattan. The following labels were used from 1940 to 1967:

Consolidation of operations
Until 1954 and 1955, when the Culver Ramp and 60th Street Tunnel Connection opened, the BMT and IND trackage was not connected. The early joint services using these connections operated similarly to trackage rights; it was not until the Chrystie Street Connection opened in 1967 that the ex-BMT and IND systems were consolidated operationally.

Beginning in 1924, BMT services were designated by number. The city assigned letters (J and up)—generally following the IND pattern of double letters for local services—in the early 1960s to prepare for the 1967 Chrystie Street Connection. Only Southern Division routes (1–4 or N–T) were labeled on maps, but all services except remnants of the old els were assigned letters:

 Unofficially signed as "M", or sometimes "S".

In 1967, the Culver and Franklin Shuttles became SS—the standard shuttle designation—and the Myrtle Local ("Myrtle (Jay)"), discontinued in 1969) was labeled MJ.

After 1967
The 1967 opening of the Chrystie Street Connection resulted in a number of changes. The following services have been operated since then:
A Eighth Avenue Express, 1967–present
B Sixth Avenue Express, 1967–present
C Eighth Avenue Local, 1967–present (CC until 1985)
D Sixth Avenue Express, 1967–present
E Eighth Avenue Local, 1967–present
EE Broadway Local, 1967–1976
F Sixth Avenue Local, 1967–present
G Brooklyn-Queens Crosstown Local, 1967–present (GG until 1985)
J Nassau Street Express, 1967–present (QJ until 1973)
K Broadway Brooklyn Local, 1967–1976 (JJ from 1967 to 1968; KK from 1968 to 1973)
K Eighth Avenue Local, 1967 - 1988 (AA until 1985)
L 14th Street-Canarsie Local, 1967–present (LL until 1985)
M Nassau Street Local, 1967–2010; Sixth Ave Local, 2010–present
MJ Myrtle Avenue Local, 1967–1969
N Broadway Express, 1967–present
NX Broadway Express, 1967–1968
Q Broadway Express, 1967–present (QB until 1985)
R Broadway Local, 1967–present (RR until 1985)
RJ Nassau Street Local, 1967–1968
S Franklin Avenue Shuttle, 1967–present (SS until 1985)
S Rockaway Park Shuttle, 1967–1972, 1985–present (HH from 1967 to 1972 and H from 1985 to 1992 and 2012-2013; part of the A and CC in between)
SS Culver Shuttle, 1967–1975
TT West End Shuttle, 1967–1968
V Sixth Avenue Local, 2001–2010
W Broadway Local, 2001–2010, 2016–present
Z Nassau Street Express, 1988–present

See also
A Division
Brooklyn–Manhattan Transit Corporation
Independent Subway System
Interborough Rapid Transit Company

References

New York City Subway
Brooklyn–Manhattan Transit Corporation
Independent Subway System